is a Japanese professional footballer who plays as a centre back for  club Nagoya Grampus.

Club statistics
Updated to 5 November 2022.

Honours

Club
Sanfrecce Hiroshima
 J.League Cup: 2022

References

External links

Profile at Sanfrecce Hiroshima 

1991 births
Living people
Toin University of Yokohama alumni
Association football people from Tokyo
Japanese footballers
J1 League players
J2 League players
Yokohama FC players
Sanfrecce Hiroshima players
Nagoya Grampus players
Association football defenders